was a monthly Japanese  manga magazine published by Hakusensha. Its first issue, the October 1981 issue, was released in September 1981. The magazine ceased publication after the release of its March 1983 issue.

References

1981 establishments in Japan
Defunct magazines published in Japan
Hakusensha magazines
Magazines established in 1981
Magazines disestablished in 1983
Monthly manga magazines published in Japan
Shōnen manga magazines
Magazines published in Tokyo